A mountain in north-central Crete, Mount Juktas ( - Giouchtas), also spelled Iuktas, Iouktas, or Ioukhtas, was an important religious site for the Minoan civilization.  Located a few kilometers from the palaces of Knossos and Fourni and the megaron at Vathypetro, Mount Juktas was the site of an important peak sanctuary in the Minoan world. At the base of Juktas, at Anemospilia, is a site that has suggested to some that the Minoans practiced human sacrifice, but the evidence is currently somewhat in question.

Peak Sanctuary 
Mount Juktas is the site of one of the most important peak sanctuaries in the Minoan world, and probably the first of them.

Archaeologial importance
Archaeologists have studied the site over an extensive period, examining fragments of pottery, remains of walls, and some unique kinds of stone that must have been hauled up the mountain because they do not otherwise occur there.

Religious importance
The mountain remains important in the religious life of the people of the area to this day – a Greek Orthodox chapel is located about a kilometer south of the sanctuary along the ridge of the mountain. Every year, people from towns down in the plains below Mount Juktas bring flowers in procession to the chapel.

Archaeology
Juktas was first excavated in 1909 by Sir Arthur Evans. It can be regarded as an adjunct archaeological site to the important Knossos site a few kilometres distant. Among the finds at the Juktas Minoan peak sanctuary were clay human and animal figurines, stone horns, stone altars, bronze double axes, and both bowls and tables with Linear A inscriptions.  See references for a more comprehensive inventory.  Pottery sherds from the site date back as far as Middle Minoan IA.

References
 Anna Simandiraki, Middle Minoan III Pottery from Building B of the Peak Sanctuary of Mount Juktas, Crete, and a general re-assessment of the Middle Minoan III Period, PhD Thesis, University of Bristol, 2002, British Library catalogue
 C. Michael Hogan (2007) Knossos fieldnotes, The Modern Antiquarian
 Donald W. Jones (1999) Peak Sanctuaries and Sacred Caves in Minoan Crete

Line notes

External links 
Juktas Peak Sanctuary at Ian Swindale's Minoan Crete website
Younger, John Linear A Texts: Religious Texts

Landforms of Heraklion (regional unit)
Peak sanctuaries
Geography of ancient Crete
Mountains of Greece
Mountains of Crete